The Young Cemetery Cabin, in Cass County, Nebraska near Plattsmouth, Nebraska, was built in 1941.  It was listed on the National Register of Historic Places in 2004.

It is located at the Young Cemetery, which was founded in 1855.  Logs to build this cabin were taken from a log cabin built in 1856. It was built by the National Youth Administration.

It is also known as the National Youth Administration Cabin.

It is located at Young Ln. E400.

References

External links

National Register of Historic Places in Cass County, Nebraska
Buildings and structures completed in 1941
National Youth Administration